William Stewart Eadie (27 November 1864 – 20 September 1914) was an English cricketer who played for Derbyshire between 1885 and 1899.

Early years 
Eadie was born in Burton-on-Trent Staffordshire, the son of James Eadie and his wife Jean. His father, who was from Scotland, had established the James Eadie brewery company at Burton in 1854.

Career 
Eadie made his debut for Derbyshire in the 1885 season.  For the years 1887 to 1893 Eadie played over 30 matches for the club while it was without first-class status. He then played first-class again intermittently until the 1899 season. He was a right arm batsman who played 41 innings in 23 first-class matches for Derbyshire, with a top score of 62 and an average of 10.5.

Death 
Eadie died at Barrow upon Trent at the age of 49.

Family 
His brother, John Eadie and nephew Kenneth Dobson both played first-class cricket for Derbyshire.

See also
Brewers of Burton

References

1864 births
1914 deaths
English cricketers
English people of Scottish descent
Derbyshire cricketers